This is a list of Mexican television related events from 2005.

Events
27 April - Evelyn Nieto wins season 3 of Big Brother México
3 July - Singer Sasha Sökol wins the sixth and final season of Big Brother VIP

Debuts

Television shows

1970s
Plaza Sésamo (1972–present)

Ending this year
Big Brother México (2002-2005, 2015–present)

Births

Deaths

See also
List of Mexican films of 2005
2005 in Mexico